Cytisophyllum sessilifolium is a species of flowering plants in the family, Fabaceae. It belongs to the subfamily Faboideae. It is the only member of the genus Cytisophyllum.

References

Genisteae
Monotypic Fabaceae genera